Jean-Pierre Biderre (born 15 June 1950) is a French racing cyclist. He rode in the 1978 Tour de France.

References

1950 births
Living people
French male cyclists
Place of birth missing (living people)